Mindaugas Timinskas (born March 28, 1974) is a Lithuanian former professional basketball player and basketball coach. He represented the senior Lithuanian national basketball team.

College career
Born in Šilutė, Lithuanian SSR, Timinskas played NCAA Division I college basketball, in the United States, at Iona College, from 1993 to 1997.

Professional career
After college, Timinskas returned to Lithuania. Timinskas began his pro career in the 1997–98 season, after he signed with his home town team of Šilutė. At the time, the team was playing in the Lithuanian Basketball League (LKL).

Timinskas left his main mark in his career, while playing with the Spanish Liga ACB club TAU Cerámica, during the EuroLeague 2000–01 Finals. During the finals, he had three double-digit scoring games, most notably with 18 points scored in Game 4, to force the series to a fifth and final contest. His rim-rocking dunk in that game, is still remembered as one of the greatest highlights of the EuroLeague's modern era (2001 to present).

Coaching career
Timinskas was named the head coach of the Cary Academy varsity basketball team, for the 2012–13 season, replacing Kenny Inge. He was let go following the 2015–16 season.

Career statistics

EuroLeague

|-
| style="text-align:left;"| 2000–00
| style="text-align:left;"| Tau Cerámica
| 22 || 4 || 22.2 || .556 || .233 || .756 || 3.0 || 1.2 || 1.0 || .2 || 6.1 || 6.1
|-
| style="text-align:left;"| 2001–02
| style="text-align:left;"| Tau Cerámica
| 10 || 6 || 22.3 || .564 || .267 || .818 || 2.8 || 1.1 || 1.6 || .3 || 7.4 || 7.8
|-
| style="text-align:left;"| 2002–03
| style="text-align:left;"| Žalgiris
| 8 || 5 || 26.4 || .356 || .471 || .909 || 5.5 || 1.4 || .9 || .5 || 9.5 || 9.4
|-
| style="text-align:left;"| 2003–04
| style="text-align:left;"| Žalgiris
| 20 || 12 || 25.1 || .542 || .341 || .714 || 5.2 || 2.1 || 1.1 || .3 || 8.0 || 10.4
|-
| style="text-align:left;"| 2004–05
| style="text-align:left;"| Žalgiris
| 20 || 19 || 30.3 || .465 || .400 || .810 || 5.3 || 2.0 || 1.3 || .3 || 12.7 || 13.8

Awards and achievements

College
MAAC Player of the Year: (1997)

Pro clubs
Lithuanian All-Star Game MVP: (2000)
Spanish ACB League Champion: (2002)
3× Lithuanian LKL League Champion: (2003, 2004, 2005)
Lithuanian League Finals MVP: (2005)

Lithuanian junior national team
1996 FIBA Europe Under-22 Championship:

Lithuanian senior national team
1995 EuroBasket: 
2000 Summer Olympics:

References

External links
Euroleague.net Profile
Eurobasket.com Profile
Spanish League Profile 
Italian League Profile 

1974 births
Living people
Basketball players at the 2000 Summer Olympics
BC Šilutė basketball players
BC Žalgiris players
Iona Gaels men's basketball players
Liga ACB players
Lithuanian expatriate basketball people in France
Lithuanian expatriate basketball people in Spain
Lithuanian expatriate basketball people in the United States
Lithuanian men's basketball players
Medalists at the 2000 Summer Olympics
Olympic basketball players of Lithuania
Olympic bronze medalists for Lithuania
Olympic medalists in basketball
People from Šilutė
Power forwards (basketball)
Saski Baskonia players
Small forwards
SIG Basket players
Valencia Basket players